Kenny Lucas and Keith Lucas (born September 13, 1985), collectively referred to as The Lucas Brothers, are American identical twin brothers who work together as comedians, actors, filmmakers, writers, and producers.

They co-wrote and co-produced Judas and the Black Messiah (2021), for which they were nominated for the Academy Award for Best Original Screenplay and the Writers Guild of America Award for Best Original Screenplay; they won the Paul Selvin Award and the NAACP Image Award for Outstanding Writing in a Motion Picture. The film itself was nominated for six Academy Awards, including the Academy Award for Best Picture.

Early lives
The Lucas Brothers were born and raised in Newark, New Jersey. They also spent some time in High Point, North Carolina. They moved to Irvington, New Jersey and both graduated from Irvington High School.

The brothers both graduated with honors from the College of New Jersey in 2007 with degrees in philosophy. Kenny attended New York University School of Law and Keith attended Duke University School of Law until the final week of their third year of law school, when they dropped out to pursue stand-up comedy full-time.

The Lucas Bros were inducted into Phi Beta Kappa as alumni members by The College of New Jersey in 2022.

Career
They made their late-night debut on Late Night With Jimmy Fallon in 2012, and have appeared as guests multiple times after. The duo created the animated series Lucas Bros. Moving Co.. They starred in truTV's series Friends of the People. They appeared in the feature film 22 Jump Street (2014). In July 2014, they made Variety magazine's "Ten Comics to Watch in 2014" list. The brothers also appeared in episodes of the highly acclaimed Fox TV series The Grinder in 2016 and have played themselves in the Netflix series Lady Dynamite.

The Lucas Brothers released their first comedy special, On Drugs, on Netflix in April 2017. Paste ranked it as the 9th best comedy special of 2017.

They have additionally provided content for Fox and the associated YouTube channel Animation Domination High-Def including the short-form web-series OG Sherlock Kush starring Peter Serafinowicz and Rich Fulcher.

Most recently, the Lucas Brothers co-wrote and co-produced Judas and the Black Messiah (2021), the biopic of Fred Hampton, which was co-written, along with Will Berson, and directed by Shaka King. For their contributions, the Lucas Brothers received nominations for the Academy Award for Best Original Screenplay and the Writers Guild of America Award for Best Original Screenplay. They won the Paul Selvin Award and the NAACP Image Award for Outstanding Writing in a Motion Picture.

They are also developing a comedy project with Phil Lord and Christopher Miller, who directed 22 Jump Street. In addition, they are set to write and star in a semi-autobiographical film to be produced by Judd Apatow.

They are paid regulars at the Comedy Cellar.

Filmography

Actors

Writers

References

External links
 Official website
 
 

1985 births
Living people
African-American male actors
African-American stand-up comedians
American stand-up comedians
American twins
African-American male comedians
American male comedians
American television writers
American male television writers
Irvington High School (New Jersey) alumni
People from Irvington, New Jersey
People from Newark, New Jersey
People from High Point, North Carolina
Duke University School of Law alumni
New York University School of Law alumni
Screenwriters from New Jersey
Screenwriters from North Carolina
Identical twin male actors
21st-century African-American people
20th-century African-American people